The Goethe Award, later known as the Comic Fan Art Award, was an American series of comic book fan awards, first presented in 1971 for comics published in 1970. The award originated with the fanzine Newfangles and then shared close ties with The Buyer's Guide to Comics Fandom.

The Goethe Award was named after Johann Wolfgang von Goethe; Goethe was the person who encouraged Rodolphe Töpffer, "the father of comic strips," to publish his stories.

The Comic Art Convention (CAC) twice hosted the presentation of the awards, at the 1972 and 1974 CACs. The format and balloting of the Comics Buyer's Guide Fan Awards, presented by the Comics Buyer's Guide from 1982 to circa 2010, were in many ways derived from the Goethe Award/Comic Fan Art Award.

Overview
The Goethe Awards/Comic Fan Art Awards were tallied yearly for comic books produced during the previous year, and were given out in several categories.

History 
Don & Maggie Thompson created the Goethe Awards in 1971; the Goethe Awards for comics published in 1970 were first published in a 1971 issue of their fanzine Newfangles.

Nominations for the 1972 Goethe Awards (for comics published in 1971) ballot were initially published in The Buyer's Guide to Comics Fandom (TBG), The Monster Times, and Graphic Story World. Nominations were sent in from 335 readers. Ultimately, there were 7 categories with 4-7 nominees in each category. 700 fans voted for the final nominees.  The 1972 Goethe Awards were presented July 3, 1972, at the Comic Art Convention, New York City, in a ceremony emceed by Tony Isabella and Carl Gafford. The award results were also published in Comic Art News & Reviews.

Ballots for the 1973 awards  (for comics published in 1972) were printed in TBG, Comic Crusader, The Comic Reader, the Gazette Advertiser, The Menomonee Falls Gazette, and Rocket's Blast Comicollector. 1,011 fans cast their votes. The results were published in The Buyer's Guide to Comics Fandom #38 (June 15, 1973).

In 1974, the Thompsons grew frustrated with perceived ballot-stuffing and passed the awards to Tony Isabella, who changed the name to the Comic Fan Art Awards. The awards for comics published in 1973 were presented at the 1974 Comic Art Convention, held at the Commodore Hotel, New York City. They were later published in TBG #63 (Aug. 1, 1974).The final Comic Fan Art Awards (for comics published in 1974) were co-administered by Ken Gale and were not announced until TBG #123 (March 26, 1976).

In 1982, the Comics Buyer's Guide (the successor to The Buyer's Guide to Comics Fandom), began presenting their Comics Buyer's Guide Fan Awards, in many ways modeled on the Goethe Award/Comic Fan Art Award.

 Winners 

 People 
Favorite Pro Artist/Penciller
 1971 Neal Adams
 1972 TK
 1973 Barry Windsor-Smith (runners-up Neal Adams, Bernie Wrightson, Jack Kirby)
 1974 Bernie Wrightson
 1975 Jim Starlin

Favorite Inker
 1975  Tom Palmer

Favorite Pro Writer
 1971 tie Denny O'Neil
 Roy Thomas
 1972 TK
 1973 Roy Thomas (runners-up Len Wein, Jack Kirby, Dennis O'Neil, Steve Englehart)
 1974  Len Wein
 1975 Roy Thomas

Favorite Pro Editor
 1971 Dick Giordano
 1972 TK
 1973 Roy Thomas (runner-up Julius Schwartz)
 1974  Roy Thomas
 1975 Roy Thomas

Favorite Fan Writer
 1971 Jan Strnad
 1972 Tony Isabella
 1973 Don & Maggie Thompson (runners- up Tom Fagan, Tony Isabella, Jan Strnad, Paul Levitz)
 1974 Don & Maggie Thompson

Favorite Fan Artist
 1971 Robert Kline
 1972 TK
 1973 Richard Corben (runners-up Don Newton, John Fantucchio, Martin Greim)
 1974 Don Newton (3rd runner-up Howard Bender)

 Works 
Favorite Pro Comic Book
 1971 Green Lantern/Green Arrow (DC)
 1972 TK
 1973 Conan (Marvel) (runners- up Swamp Thing, Tarzan, The Avengers)
 1974 Swamp Thing (DC)
 1975 E-Man (Charlton)

Favorite Underground Comic/Non-Newsstand Comic
 1971 Captain George Presents, by George Henderson of Toronto, Canada
 1972 TK
 1973 The Menomonee Falls Gazette (runners-up Bedtime Stories, Further Adventures of the Fabulous Furry Freak Brothers, Fantagor, Skull Comics, Phase)

Favorite Comic-Book Story
 1971 "No Evil Shall Escape My Sight" by Denny O'Neil and Neal Adams in Green Lantern/Green Arrow #76 (DC)
 1972 TK
 1973 "The Black Hound of Vengeance!" in Conan #20; (runners-up "And Through Him Save a World" in Green Lantern #89; "The Pact" in New Gods #20; "Dark Genesis" in Swamp Thing #1)
 1974 "Night of the Bat," by Len Wein, Bernie Wrightson, and Joe Orlando in Swamp Thing #7 (DC)

Favorite Comic-Book Character: 
 1971 Deadman (DC)
 1972 TK
 1973 Conan (Marvel) (runners-up Batman, Spider-Man, Tarzan, Green Arrow)
 1974 Conan (Marvel)

Favorite Fanzine
 1971 Newfangles 1972 The Buyer's Guide to Comics Fandom 1973 The Comic Reader (edited by Paul Levitz (runners-up The Buyer's Guide to Comics Fandom, Comixscene, Comic Crusader, Graphic Story World, Rocket's Blast Comicollector)
 1974  The Comic Reader (edited by Paul Levitz)
 1975  The Comic Reader''

References 

Comics awards